Anton Yuryevich Makurin (born 12 December 1994) is a Russian football player. He plays for FC Novosibirsk.

Career
He made his professional debut in the Russian Professional Football League for FC Tom-2 Tomsk on 19 July 2014 in a game against FC Yakutiya Yakutsk.

He made his Russian Premier League debut for FC Tom Tomsk on 11 March 2017 in a game against PFC CSKA Moscow.

References

External links
 Career summary by sportbox.ru

1994 births
Sportspeople from Tomsk
Living people
Russian footballers
FC Tom Tomsk players
Association football midfielders
Russian Premier League players